New Kids is a Dutch television show.

It may also refer to:

The New Kids, a 1985 film
A series of albums by iKon:
New Kids: Begin (2016)
New Kids: Continue (2018)
New Kids: The Final (2018)
The New Kids (album) (2019)

See also
New Kids on the Block, American musical group